Country Code: +682
International Call Prefix: 00

National Significant Numbers (NSN): five (5) digits

Format: +682 XX XXX

Number allocations in the Cook Islands

See also 
 Telecommunications in the Cook Islands

References

Cook Islands
Communications in the Cook Islands